Homewood station is an Amtrak intercity and Metra commuter train station in Homewood, Illinois. It is also the location of the Homewood Railroad Park Museum.

It is also  from Union Station, the northern terminus of the three Amtrak services which stop here.

History 
The Illinois Central Railroad built Homewood in 1923 to serve the Panama Limited and Seminole Limited. The station house, now used by Amtrak, was built in a mission revival style in order to complement the architecture of the clubhouse of the nearby Ravisloe Country Club.

Three years after the station opened, commuter services began. In the 1960s the station also served such IC trains as the City of New Orleans, Creole, and Green Diamond. In 1971, Amtrak assumed control of the Illinois Central's passenger operations and continued to stop at Homewood. Metra purchased the commuter services in 1987. In 2003 the Homewood Rail Heritage Committee approved the installation of a train watching platform for railfans similar to that of the Rochelle Railroad Park in Rochelle, Illinois. As with many suburban Metra stations, bus connections are provided by Pace Transit Systems.

On the Metra Electric, it is a regular stop on the main line. On Amtrak, it is served by the regional  and the long-distance City of New Orleans.

2020s renovation 
The station is undergoing renovations. The renovations will improve the facilitates and bring the station complex into compliance with the Americans with Disabilities Act of 1990. Prior to the renovation, among the accessibility issues was a lack of an accessible path to the platforms from the west-side of the tracks (where Amtrak's station building is located).

The first part of the project is a $15 million renovation by Amtrak of its facilities at the station. This project is utilizing federal funds. The Amtrak station closed in August 2020 for the renovations. Much of the architectural features of the Amtrak portion of the station will be retained, as the facility is on the Illinois Register of Historical Places. It will be expanded with a new structure. Amtrak will construct demolish the current boarding platform and build a new covered island platform to serve the two tracks that its trains utilize at the station.

After the Amtrak completes its renovation of its facilities, Metra will, separately, begin a $14 million renovation of their facilities at the station. Metra's plans are to replace their station structure at Harwood Avenue and Ridge Road with a new structure, and to renovate the track-access tunnel. The project will also see the adjacent Pace bus terminal reconfigured It will be funded, through a combined $9 million funds from the Federal Transit Administration and Chicago Metropolitan Agency for Planning, with a further $4 million coming from Metra, $585,000 coming from Homewood, and $300,000 coming from Cook County. Metra's renovation of their facilities  at the Homewood station was announced in 2020, and is part of a five-year capital investment plan involving the renovation of nine stations (including Homewood) on the Metra Electric District.

Bus connections 
Pace
 356 Harvey/Homewood/Tinley Park 
 359 Robbins/South Kedzie Avenue 
 372 Dixie Highway

References

External links 

Homewood Amtrak Station (USA Rail Guide -- Train Web)
Homewood Railroad Park (NRHS: Blackhawk Chapter)
Chicago Railfan image (Homewood Station)

Amtrak stations in Illinois
Metra stations in Illinois
Former Illinois Central Railroad stations
Railway stations in the United States opened in 1923
Railway stations in Cook County, Illinois
1923 establishments in Illinois